Madman at War is a 1985 Italian-French comedy film directed by Dino Risi. It was entered into the 1985 Cannes Film Festival.

Plot
At the beginning of World War II a young Italian psychiatrist is sent to troops in Libya. When he learns that his commander is a madman he tries to protect the subordinates from harm.

Cast
 Coluche as Oscar Pilli
 Beppe Grillo as Marcello Lupi
 Bernard Blier as Belucci
 Fabio Testi as Boda
 Claudio Bisio as Pintus
 Gianni Franco as Cerioni
 Franco Diogene (credited as Francesco Diogene) as Nitti 
 Sandro Ghiani as Puddu
 Guido Nicheli as Rossi
 Tiziana Altieri as Fatma
 Geoffrey Copleston as the German commander

References

External links
 

1985 films
1985 comedy films
French comedy films
Italian comedy films
1980s French-language films
1980s Italian-language films
Films directed by Dino Risi
Commedia all'italiana
North African campaign films
Films scored by Guido & Maurizio De Angelis
Films with screenplays by Age & Scarpelli
Films produced by Claude Berri
Films with screenplays by Claude Berri
1985 multilingual films
French multilingual films
Italian multilingual films
1980s French films
1980s Italian films